The Team Speedway Polish Championship (Polish: Drużynowe Mistrzostwa Polski, DMP) is an annual speedway event held each year in different Polish clubs organized by the Polish Motor Union (PZM) since 1978.

The team winning the league is awarded a gold medal and declared Polish Team Champions. Teams finishing second and third are awarded silver and bronze medals respectively.

PZM Cup Winners

Previous winners

Notes

See also

Team 21
Speedway Junior